Lăpușel may refer to:

 Lăpușel, a village in Recea, Maramureș Commune, Romania
 Lăpușel River, a tributary of the Izvorul River in Romania.

See also 
 Lăpuș (disambiguation)